WQMS is an AM radio station licensed to Quitman, Mississippi. It operates with 1,000 watts during daytime hours only on 1500 kHz. As of July 12, 2019, the station is dark.

History
WQMS began in 1965 as WBFN. The station changed callsigns to WQMS on November 27, 2001.

Translator
WQMS is relayed on the FM band via translator W274CH, which transmits with 78 watts effective radiated power on 102.7 MHz. W274CH signed on on December 14, 2021.

References

External links

QMS
Clarke County, Mississippi
Radio stations established in 1965
1965 establishments in Mississippi
QMS